Attorney General Pollock may refer to:

Ernest Pollock, 1st Viscount Hanworth (1861–1936), Attorney General for England and Wales
Sir Frederick Pollock, 1st Baronet (1783–1870), Attorney General for England and Wales
Henry Pollock (1864–1953), Attorney General of Hong Kong and Attorney General of Fiji

See also
General Pollock (disambiguation)